Howard Junker is a writer and editor.

Early life and education
Howard Junker was born in 1940 in Port Washington, New York, and educated at Canterbury School (Connecticut). He graduated from Amherst College in 1961, and earned an M.A. from the University of San Francisco in 1978.

Career
Junker's work as a journalist appeared in a range of American magazines from the mid-1960s, including Art in America, Artforum, Film Comment, Film Quarterly, The Nation, The New Republic, New York, Playboy, Rolling Stone, The Village Voice and Vogue.

His 1965 article in The Nation about Andy Warhol's work as a filmmaker—among the first articles on the subject—is anthologized in a collection of notable film writing from the magazine.  Junker's production notes on the Maysles Brothers/Charlotte Zwerin film Salesmen (1969), included in a contemporaneous book about the film, lend insight to the methods of these pioneering documentarians.

In 1985, Junker founded the literary journal ZYZZYVA. The journal initially emphasized west coast writers and later broadened to focus on new work from around the United States and internationally. Under Junker's editorship, ZYZZYVA published early works by Po Bronson, Chitra Divakaruni, F.X. Toole, David Rains Wallace and Sherman Alexie, among others. ZYZZYVA also presented Haruki Murakami's first English-language publication.  Junker retired from ZYZZYVA in 2010 and was succeeded by Laura Cogan. He has edited several anthologies of works published in ZYZZYVA, as well as a multi-volume memoir. He resides in San Francisco.

Selected bibliography

References

External links
 Howard Junker web site
 ZYZZYVA web site

1940 births
Living people
American magazine editors
American magazine publishers (people)
Canterbury School (Connecticut) alumni
People from Port Washington, New York